The following is an incomplete discography for Definitive Jux, an independent hip hop record label based in New York City, United States. Artists such as El-P, Aesop Rock, Cannibal Ox, Mr. Lif, RJD2, and Cage have released records through Definitive Jux.

Albums
2000: Mr. Lif – Enters the Colossus (EP)
2001: Various Artists – Def Jux Presents
2001: Cannibal Ox – The Cold Vein
2001: Aesop Rock – Labor Days
2001: Various Artists – Farewell Fondle 'Em
2002: Aesop Rock – Daylight (EP)
2002: Various Artists – Def Jux Presents 2
2002: El-P – Fantastic Damage
2002: Mr. Lif – Emergency Rations (EP)
2002: RJD2 – Deadringer
2002: Mr. Lif – I Phantom
2003: RJD2 – The Horror (EP)
2003: Murs – The End of the Beginning
2003: S.A. Smash – Smashy Trashy
2003: Party Fun Action Committee – Let's Get Serious
2003: C-Rayz Walz – Ravipops (The Substance)
2003: Aesop Rock – Bazooka Tooth
2004: Various Artists – Def Jux Presents 3
2004: Murs & 9th Wonder – Murs 3:16: The 9th Edition
2004: RJD2 – Since We Last Spoke
2004: Hangar 18 – The Multi-Platinum Debut Album
2004: C-Rayz Walz – We Live: The Black Samurai (EP)
2004: Rob Sonic – Telicatessen
2005: Aesop Rock – Fast Cars, Danger, Fire and Knives (EP)
2005: The Perceptionists – Black Dialogue
2005: C-Rayz Walz – Year of the Beast
2005: Cage – Hell's Winter
2006: Cool Calm Pete – Lost
2006: Mr. Lif – Mo' Mega
2007: Various Artists – Definitive Swim
2007: El-P – I'll Sleep When You're Dead
2007: Aesop Rock – None Shall Pass
2007: Rob Sonic – Sabotage Gigante
2007: Junk Science – Gran'dad's Nerve Tonic
2007: Hangar 18 – Sweep the Leg
2008: Sonic Sum – Films
2008: Del the Funky Homosapien – Eleventh Hour
2008: Dizzee Rascal – Maths + English
2008: Chin Chin – Chin Chin
2008: The Mighty Underdogs – Droppin' Science Fiction
2009: Chin Chin – The Flashing, The Fancing
2009: Cage – Depart From Me
2009: Various Artists – Def Jux Presents 4
2010: Camu Tao – King of Hearts

Catalog
This list is organized by catalog number, a roughly chronological number system established by the label and typically printed on or assigned to each official release.  Official pressings on the Definitive Jux are cataloged by the acronym "DJX", while downloadable releases are cataloged by "DRX".  Both are presented below.
{| class="wikitable"
! width="33"|Year
! width="28"|No.
! width="210"|Artist(s)
! Title
|-
|align="center" rowspan="2"|2000
|align="center"|1
|Mr. Lif
|"Front on This"
|-
|align="center"|2
|Company Flow
|"D.P.A."
|-
|align="center" rowspan="17"|2001
|align="center"|3
|rowspan="2"|Mr. Lif
|Enters the Colossus
|-
|align="center"|4
|"Cro-Magnon"
|-
|align="center"|5
|various artists
|Def Jux Presents
|-
|align="center"|6
|rowspan="2"|Cannibal Ox
|"Vein"
|-
|align="center"|7
|The Cold Vein
|-
|align="center"|8
|RJD2
|"June"
|-
|align="center"|9
|Aesop Rock
|"Coma"
|-
|align="center"|10
|Masai Bey
|"Paper Mache"
|-
|align="center"|11
|Aesop Rock
|"Boombox"
|-
|align="center"|12
|RJD2
|"Let the Good Times Roll" (sampler)
|-
|align="center"|13
|Aesop Rock
|Labor Days
|-
|align="center"|14
|rowspan="2"|Cannibal Ox
|"The F-Word" (promo)
|-
|align="center"|15
|"The F-Word"
|-
|align="center"|16
|various artists
|"Fondle 'Em Fossils"
|-
|align="center"|17
|El-P
|"Stepfather Factory"
|-
|align="center"|18
|Yakballz
|"The Freakshow"
|-
|align="center"|19
|various artists
|Farewell Fondle 'Em
|-
|align="center" rowspan="9"|2002
|align="center"|20
|The Weathermen / Mr. Lif & Murs
|split
|-
|align="center"|21
|Aesop Rock
|Daylight
|-
|align="center"|22
|various artists
|Def Jux Presents 2
|-
|align="center"|23
|Camu Tao
|"Wireless"
|-
|align="center"|24
|rowspan="2"|El-P
|El-P Presents Cannibal Oxtrumentals
|-
|align="center"|25
|"Deep Space 9 mm"
|-
|align="center"|26
|Mr. Lif
|"Home of the Brave"
|-
|align="center"|27
|El-P
|Fantastic Damage
|-
|align="center"|28
|El-P
|"Truancy"
|-
|
|align="center"|29
|–
|–
|-
|align="center" rowspan="5"|2002
|align="center"|30
|Mr. Lif
|Emergency Rations
|-
|align="center"|31
|El-P
|"Dead Disnee"
|-
|align="center"|32
|Mr. Lif
|Emergency Rations Instrumentals
|-
|align="center"|33
|El-P
|Fandamstrumentals
|-
|align="center"|34
|RJD2
|"Let the Good Times Roll"
|-
|align="center"|2003
|align="center"|35
|RJD2
|Deadringer
|-
|align="center" rowspan="2"|2002
|align="center"|36
|rowspan="2"|Mr. Lif
|"New Man Theme"
|-
|align="center"|37
|I Phantom
|-
|
|align="center"|38
|–
|–
|-
|align="center" rowspan="3"|2002
|align="center"|39
|El-P
|FanDam Plus
|-
|align="center"|40
|Mr. Lif
|I Phantom Instrumentals
|-
|align="center"|41
|El-P
|Remix'd
|-
|
|align="center"|42
|–
|–
|-
|
|align="center"|43
|–
|–
|-
|
|align="center"|44
|–
|–
|-
|align="center"|2002
|align="center"|45
|Mr. Lif
|"Live From The Plantation" picture disc
|-
|align="center"|2002
|align="center"|46
|RJD2
|"The Horror"
|-
|align="center" rowspan="3"|2003
|align="center"|47
|rowspan="2"|MURS
|"Gods Work"
|-
|align="center"|48
|The End of the Beginning
|-
|align="center"|49
|The Presence
|"Woke"
|-
|
|align="center"|50
|–
|–
|-
|align="center" rowspan="3"|2003
|align="center"|51
|RJD2
|The Horror
|-
|align="center"|52
|S.A. Smash
|"Gangsta"
|-
|align="center"|53
|MURS
|"Risky Business"
|-
|
|align="center"|54
|–
|–
|-
|align="center"|2003
|align="center"|55
|S.A. Smash
|Smashy Trashy
|-
|
|align="center"|56
|C-Rayz Walz
|"White Label"
|-
|align="center"|2002
|align="center"|57
|MURS
|"Transitionz Az a Ridah"
|-
|
|align="center"|58
|various artists
|Phase2 Mega Mix
|-
|align="center"|2003
|align="center"|59
|Party Fun Action Committee
|"Beer"
|-
|align="center" rowspan="4"|2003
|align="center"|60
|RJD2
|"Sell the World"
|-
|align="center"|61
|S.A. Smash
|Smashy Trashy Instrumentals
|-
|align="center"|62
|C-Rayz Walz
|"The Essence"
|-
|align="center"|63
|rowspan="2"|Party Fun Action Committee
|Let's Get Serious
|-
|
|align="center"|64
|
|-
|align="center" rowspan="5"|2003
|align="center"|65
|C-Rayz Walz
|Ravipops (The Substance)
|-
|align="center"|66
|rowspan="3"|Aesop Rock
|"Limelighters"
|-
|align="center"|67
|"Freeze"
|-
|align="center"|68
|Bazooka Tooth
|-
|align="center"|69
|S.A. Smash
|"Illy"
|-
|align="center"|
|align="center"|70
|–
|–
|-
|align="center" rowspan="2"|2003
|align="center"|71
|Hangar 18
|"Where We At"
|-
|align="center"|72
|C-Rayz Walz
|"Buck 80"
|-
|align="center"|
|align="center"|73
|–
|–
|-
|align="center"|2003
|align="center"|74
|Aesop Rock
|"Easy"
|-
|align="center" rowspan="2"|2004
|align="center"|75
|The Perceptionists
|"Medical Aid"
|-
|align="center"|76
|various artists
|Def Jux Presents 3
|-
|align="center"|
|align="center"|77
|–
|–
|-
|align="center" rowspan="5"|2004
|align="center"|78
|Hangar 18
|"Beatslope"
|-
|align="center"|79
|El-P
|"WMR"
|-
|align="center"|80
|MURS
|Murs 3:16: The 9th Edition
|-
|align="center"|81
|Aesop Rock
|"All in All"
|-
|align="center"|82
|MURS
|"Badman"
|-
|align="center"|
|align="center"|83
|–
|–
|-
|align="center" rowspan="3"|2004
|align="center"|84
|rowspan="2"|RJD2
|Since We Last Spoke
|-
|align="center"|85
|"Exotic Talk"
|-
|align="center"|86
|Hangar 18
|"Barhoppin"
|-
|align="center"|
|align="center"|87
|–
|–
|-
|align="center"|2004
|align="center"|88
|Hangar 18
|The Multiplatinum Debut Album
|-
|align="center"|
|align="center"|89
|–
|–
|-
|align="center"|
|align="center"|90
|RJD2
|Holy Toledo
|-
|align="center"|2004
|align="center"|91
|C-Rayz Walz
|"We Live"
|-
|align="center"|
|align="center"|92
|RJD2
|Two Mashed-Up Mixes 12"
|-
|align="center"|2004
|align="center"|93
|C-Rayz Walz
|We Live: The Black Samurai
|-
|align="center"|
|align="center"|94
|–
|–
|-
|align="center"|2004
|align="center"|95
|Rob Sonic
|Telicatessen
|-
|align="center"|
|align="center"|96
|–
|–
|-
|align="center" rowspan="5"|2004
|align="center"|97
|RJD2
|"1976"
|-
|align="center"|98
|The Perceptionists
|"Memorial Day"
|-
|align="center"|99
|rowspan="2"|El-P
|Collecting the Kid
|-
|align="center"|100
|"Jukie Skate Rock"
|-
|align="center"|101
|Aesop Rock
|Build Your Own Bazooka Tooth
|-
|align="center"|
|align="center"|102
|Rob Sonic
|"Shoplift"
|-
|align="center" rowspan="2"|2005
|align="center"|103
|rowspan="2"|The Perceptionists
|Black Dialogue
|-
|align="center"|104
|"Blo"
|-
|align="center"|
|align="center"|105
|–
|–
|-
|align="center" rowspan="2"|2005
|align="center"|106
|rowspan="2"|Aesop Rock
|rowspan="2"|Fast Cars, Danger, Fire and Knives
|-
|align="center"|107
|-
|align="center"|2006
|align="center"|126
|Cool Calm Pete
|Lost
|-
|align="center"|
|align="center"|127
|–
|–
|-
|align="center"|
|align="center"|128
|–
|–
|-
|align="center"|2006
|align="center"|129
|Mr. Lif
|Mo' Mega
|-
|align="center"|
|align="center"|130
|–
|–
|-
|align="center"|
|align="center"|131
|–
|–
|-
|align="center"|2007
|align="center"|132
|El-P
|"Everything Must Go"
|-
|align="center"|
|align="center"|133
|–
|–
|-
|align="center"|
|align="center"|134
|–
|–
|-
|align="center"|
|align="center"|135
|–
|–
|-
|align="center"|
|align="center"|136
|–
|–
|-
|align="center" rowspan="2"|2007
|align="center"|137
|rowspan="2"|El-P
|I'll Sleep When You're Dead
|-
|align="center"|138
|"Smithereens"
|-
|
|align="center"|139
|–
|–
|-
|
|align="center"|140
|–
|–
|-
|
|align="center"|141
|–
|–
|-
|
|align="center"|142
|–
|–
|-
|align="center" rowspan="2"|2007
|align="center"|143
|rowspan="2"|Aesop Rock
|"Coffee"
|-
|align="center"|144
|None Shall Pass
|-
|
|align="center"|145
|–
|–
|-
|
|align="center"|146
|–
|–
|-
|
|align="center"|147
|–
|–
|-
|align="center" rowspan="5"|2007
|align="center"|148
|rowspan="2"|Rob Sonic
|"Rock the Convoy"
|-
|align="center"|149
|Sabotage Gigante
|-
|align="center"|150
|Junk Science
|Gran'Dad's Nerve Tonic
|-
|align="center"|151
|rowspan="2"|Hangar 18
|"Think Big"
|-
|align="center"|152
|Sweep the Leg
|-
|
|align="center"|153
|–
|–
|-
|
|align="center"|154
|Sonic Sum
|Films
|-
|align="center"|2007
|align="center"|155
|Aesop Rock
|"None Shall Pass"
|-
|align="center"|2008
|align="center"|156
|Del tha Funkee Homosapien
|Eleventh Hour
|-
|align="center"|2009
|align="center"|157
|Danny!
|"Just Friends"
|-
|align="center"|
|align="center"|158
|–
|–
|-
|align="center"|
|align="center"|159
|–
|–
|-
|align="center"|
|align="center"|160
|–
|–
|-
|align="center"|
|align="center"|161
|–
|–
|-
|align="center"|
|align="center"|162
|–
|–
|-
|align="center"|
|align="center"|163
|–
|–
|-
|align="center"|
|align="center"|164
|–
|–
|-
|align="center"|
|align="center"|165
|–
|–
|-
|align="center"|
|align="center"|166
|–
|–
|-
|align="center"|
|align="center"|167
|–
|–
|-
|align="center"|
|align="center"|168
|–
|–
|-
|align="center"|
|align="center"|169
|–
|–
|-
|align="center"|
|align="center"|170
|–
|–
|-
|align="center"|
|align="center"|171
|–
|–
|-
|align="center"|
|align="center"|172
|–
|–
|-
|align="center"|
|align="center"|173
|–
|–
|-
|align="center"|
|align="center"|174
|–
|–
|-
|align="center"|
|align="center"|175
|–
|–
|-
|align="center"|
|align="center"|176
|–
|–
|-
|align="center"|
|align="center"|177
|–
|–
|-
|align="center"|
|align="center"|178
|–
|–
|-
|align="center"|
|align="center"|179
|–
|–
|-
|align="center"|
|align="center"|180
|–
|–
|-
|align="center"|
|align="center"|181
|–
|–
|-
|align="center"|
|align="center"|182
|–
|–
|-
|align="center"|
|align="center"|183
|–
|–
|-
|align="center"|2009
|align="center"|184
|various artists
|Def Jux Presents IV
|}

"–" denotes unassigned catalog numbers.

Downloadable releases (DRX)
{| class="wikitable"
! width="33"|Year
! width="28"|No.
! width="210"|Artist(s)
! Title
|-
|align="center"|
|align="center"|1
|–
|–
|-
|align="center"|
|align="center"|2
|–
|–
|-
|align="center"|2005
|align="center"|3
|various artists
|Bucket of B-Sides Vol. 1
|-
|align="center"|
|align="center"|4
|–
|–
|-
|align="center" rowspan="2"|2007
|align="center"|5
|Hangar 18
|"Baking Soda"
|-
|align="center"|6
|Rob Sonic
|"Fatman and Littleboy"
|-
|align="center"|
|align="center"|7
|Despot
|"Crap Artists"
|-
|align="center"|
|align="center"|8
|Cage
|"Days"
|-
|align="center"|
|align="center"|9
|Mr. Lif
|"Brothaz"
|-
|align="center"|
|align="center"|10
|El-P
|"Everything Must Go"
|-
|align="center"|
|align="center"|11
|–
|–
|-
|align="center"|
|align="center"|12
|–
|–
|-
|align="center"|2006
|align="center"|13
|Aesop Rock
|"Fishtales"
|-
|align="center"|
|align="center"|14
|Cage
|"Shhot Frank (remix)"
|-
|align="center"|
|align="center"|15
|Mr. Lif
|"Brothaz (Cassettes Won't Listen remix)"
|-
|align="center"|
|align="center"|16
|Cage
|"Too Heavy for Cherubs - Live In Miami"
|-
|align="center"|2005
|align="center"|17
|Cannibal Ox
|Return of the Ox: Live at CMJ
|-
|align="center"|
|align="center"|18
|Cage
|"Good Morning - Live"
|-
|align="center"|
|align="center"|19
|Mr. Lif
|"Fries (Abdul Malik remix)"
|-
|align="center"|
|align="center"|20
|Hangar 18
|"Who Said it Best"
|-
|align="center"|
|align="center"|21
|Slow Suicide Stimulus
|Slow Suicide Stimulus
|-
|align="center"|
|align="center"|22
|Hangar 18
|Baking Soda – Recut Recooked Remixed
|-
|align="center"|
|align="center"|23
|Danny!
|Charm
|-
|align="center"|
|align="center"|24
|Junk Science
|"Hey!"
|-
|align="center"|2007
|align="center"|25
|Cool Calm Pete
|Loosies – Remixes and Other Oddities
|-
|align="center"|2008
|align="center"|26
|Aesop Rock
|"Ghosts of the Barbary Coast"
|}

References

General
  Note: User must navigate to individual band, artist, and/or release pages.
  Note: User must navigate to Pop > Label, and enter "Definitive Jux" in text box.  Select first search result.

Specific

External links
Definitive Jux official website

Discographies of American record labels